First Presbyterian Church Manse (Farris Apartments) is a historic church manse at 305 Main Street in Clarksville, Tennessee.

It was built in 1890 and added to the National Register in 2001.

References

Houses in Montgomery County, Tennessee
Churches on the National Register of Historic Places in Tennessee
Italianate architecture in Tennessee
Churches completed in 1890
19th-century Presbyterian church buildings in the United States
Buildings and structures in Clarksville, Tennessee
National Register of Historic Places in Montgomery County, Tennessee
Italianate church buildings in the United States